Kurt Donoghoe is an Australian professional rugby league footballer who plays as a  for the Dolphins in the NRL.

Background 
Donoghoe is of Fijian descent and played his junior rugby league for the Central Newcastle Butcher Boys and attended Hunter Sports High School.

Playing career

Early career
In 2018, Donoghoe represented Australia Under-18 at the Touch Football World Cup. In 2019, he played for the Newcastle Knights Development Squad in the Laurie Daley Cup. Later that year he played for the Newcastle Knights in the NRL Touch Premiership.

In 2020, Donoghoe played for the Knights in the Jersey Flegg Cup, playing one game before the competition was cancelled. In 2021, he played for the club's New South Wales Cup side. In May 2022, he was named in Fiji's 2022 Rugby League World Cup train-on squad.

In September 2022, he played in the Knights' Jersey Flegg Cup Grand Final loss to the Penrith Panthers.

2023
In 2023, Donoghoe signed with the Central Queensland Capras and underwent pre-season training with their NRL affiliate club, the Dolphins.

On 1 March, after playing in all three of the Dolphins' trial games, Donoghoe signed a one-year contract with the club, joining their NRL squad.

In Round 1 of the 2023 NRL season, he made his NRL debut in the Dolphins' inaugural match against the Sydney Roosters.

References

External links 
 Dolphins profile

2001 births
Living people
Australian rugby league players
Australian people of Fijian descent
Dolphins (NRL) players
Rugby league five-eighths